Absolute Animals 1964–1968 is a compilation album of The Animals, released in 2003 and which features many of their hits. It was also the first compilation to feature songs from their Columbia, Decca, and MGM albums.

"Ring of Fire", "Coloured Rain", and "Good Times" are the only songs on this compilation which did not chart on the US Billboard Hot 100.

Track list

 "The House of the Rising Sun" – 4:29
 "Boom Boom" (John Lee Hooker) – 3:17
 "I'm Crying" (Eric Burdon, Alan Price) – 2:46
 "Baby Let Me Take You Home" – 2:20
 "Don't Let Me Be Misunderstood" (Bennie Benjamin, Gloria Caldwell, Sol Marcus) – 2:27
 "Bring It On Home to Me" (Sam Cooke) – 2:42
 "We Gotta Get out of This Place" (B.E. Mann, Cynthia Weil) – 3:13
 "It's My Life" (Roger Atkins, Carl Derrico) – 3:06
 "Inside-Looking Out" (Burdon, Chandler, Lomax, Alan Lomax) – 3:46
 "Don't Bring Me Down" (Gerry Goffin, King) – 3:15
 "See See Rider" (Ma Rainey) – 4:02
 "Help Me Girl" (Scott English, Weiss) – 2:40
 "When I Was Young" (Vic Briggs, Burdon, Barry Jenkins, Daniel McCulloch, John Weider) – 3:00
 "San Franciscan Nights" (Briggs, Burdon, Jenkins, McCulloch, Weider) – 3:20
 "Monterey" (Briggs, Burdon, Jenkins, McCulloch, Weider) – 4:37
 "Sky Pilot" (Briggs, Burdon, Jenkins, McCulloch, Weider) – 7:24
 "Ring of Fire" (June Carter Cash, Merle Kilgore) – 4:46
 "Good Times" (Briggs, Burdon, Jenkins, McCulloch, Weider) – 3:00
 "Coloured Rain" (Jim Capaldi, Steve Winwood, Wood) – 9:31
 "Animal Interviews" (Burdon, Alan Price) – 4:35

Personnel

 Eric Burdon – Vocals
 Hilton Valentine
 Barry Jenkins – Drums
 Chas Chandler – Bass guitar
 John Weider – Guitar, violin, bass
 Vic Briggs – Guitar
 Danny McCulloch
 John Steel – Drums
 Alan Price – Keyboard
 Zoot Money – Keyboard
 Andy Summers – Guitar

References

External links
 Absolute Animals 1964-1968 on AllMusic

2003 compilation albums
The Animals albums
Raven Records compilation albums